Fabiola is a 1918 Italian silent historical film directed by Enrico Guazzoni and starring Augusto Mastripietri, Amleto Novelli and Elena Sangro. It is an adaptation of the 1854 novel Fabiola by Nicholas Patrick Wiseman about the rise of Christianity in the Roman Empire. It was one of a series of historical epics for which the Italian film industry became famous during the era. The novel was later turned into a sound film of the same name in 1949.

Cast
Augusto Mastripietri: Eurota
Amleto Novelli: Fulvio
Elena Sangro: Fabiola
Livio Pavanelli: San Sebastiano
Giulia Cassini-Rizzotto: Lucia
Bruno Castellani: Quadrato
Valeria Sanfilippo: Santa Cecilia
Signora Poletti: Sant' Agnese
Signora Tirelli: Afra

References

Bibliography
Sorlin, Pierre. Italian National Cinema 1896-1996. Routledge, 1996.

External links

1918 films
1910s historical drama films
Italian historical drama films
Italian silent feature films
1910s Italian-language films
Films directed by Enrico Guazzoni
Films set in Rome
Films set in the Roman Empire
Films set in the 4th century
Films based on British novels
Religious epic films
Italian black-and-white films
1918 drama films
Articles containing video clips
Silent drama films
Silent adventure films